William Melis (born August 28, 1960) is a former Greek–American professional basketball player.

College career
Melis played  college basketball at Kenyon College. He was the captain of the team during 1981-82 season. Moreover, he is still one of the most pertinent players of his college, having almost 49% at field goals.

Professional career
Melis started his professional career in 1982 playing with Apollon Patras B.C. At his first season, one of his best performance was a game against PAOK. Melis scored 27 points in a 73-85 home defeat. At 1986–87 season Melis scored 361 points in Greek Basketball League and he finished in first ten scorers.
In 1988 he was transferred to PAOK. Thessaloniki's club paid to Apollon 25 million  Greek drachma and gave five players, including Mark Petteway, Zaharias Katsoulis, Gerasimos Tzakis, Platon Hotokouridis and Panagiotis Kalogiros. He played two years with PAOK, and he missed 1990-91 season due to a serious family problem. Melis joined to Dafni in 1991, and he played for three years in the Greek Basketball League. He finished his career playing in Greek A2 Basket League with Peiraikos Syndesmos and Milon.

References

External links 
at esake.gr

1960 births
Living people
American people of Greek descent
Apollon Patras B.C. players
Dafnis B.C. players
Greek men's basketball players
Greek Basket League players
Milon B.C. players
P.A.O.K. BC players
Peiraikos Syndesmos B.C. players
Power forwards (basketball)